is a Japanese voice actor who works for Production Baobab.

Filmography

Television animation
Star of the Giants (1968) (Mishima)
Judo Boy (1969) (Sanshiro)
Wandering Sun (1971) (Yumemaro)
Casshan (1973) (Casshern)
Brave Raideen (1975) (Tarou Sarumaru)
The Adventures of Tom Sawyer (1980) (Jim)
New Tetsujin-28 (1980) (Robby)
The Irresponsible Captain Tylor (1993) (Robert J. Hanner)
Nintama Rantarō (1993) (Rantaro's Father)
Mahōjin Guru Guru (1994) (President of Darkness) 
Rurouni Kenshin (1996) (Saizuchi)
Berserk (1997) (Godo)
Rozen Maiden (2004) (Motoharu Shibasaki)
Samurai 7 (2004) (Gisaku)
Naruto (2005) (Sukeza)
Negima! Magister Negi Magi (2005) (Principal of Magic Academy)
Romeo × Juliet (2007) (Balthasar)
Naruto: Shippuden (2009) (Fukasaku)
Fate/Zero (2012) (Glen Mackenzie)

OVA
Legend of the Galactic Heroes (1996)
Blue Submarine No. 6 (1998) (Hugh W. Conwell)
Mobile Suit Gundam Unicorn (2010) (Doillon)

Theatrical animation
Appleseed (1988) (Elder Hestia)
Lupin III: Dead or Alive (1996)
Naruto the Movie: Ninja Clash in the Land of Snow (2004) (Sandayū Asama)

Video games
Jak and Daxter: The Precursor Legacy (2001) (Explorer)
Mega Man Zero 4 (2005) (Popla Cocapetri)
Odin Sphere (2007) (Matthew and Skulldy)
Ratchet & Clank Future: A Crack in Time (2009) (Orvus)

Tokusatsu
Ultraman Taro (1973) (Voice of Alien Mefilas II, (Ep 27) Alien Katan, (Ep 35) Alien Medusa (Ep 37) )
Jumborg Ace (1973) (Voice of OnestoKing, (Ep 41) Alien Gross (Last Episode) )
Choujinki Metalder (1987) (Voice of Light Fighter Hedogross)

Dubbing

Live-action
Blue Velvet (Ben (Dean Stockwell))
Cube (Rennes (Wayne Robson))
Don't Be Afraid of the Dark (Emerson Blackwood (Garry McDonald))
Elizabeth (Palace Chamberlain (Peter Stockbridge))
L.A. Law (Leland McKenzie (Richard Dysart))
A Life Less Ordinary (Naville (Ian Holm))
Larger than Life (Wee St. Francis (Tracey Walter))
North Sea Hijack (1988 TV Asahi edition (Herring (David Wood)))
Picket Fences (Judge Henry Bone (Ray Walston))
Prison Break (Charles Westmoreland (Muse Watson))
The Storyteller (Dog (Brian Henson))
Sky Captain and the World of Tomorrow (Dr. Walter Jennings (Trevor Baxter))

Animated
Batman: The Animated Series (Temple Fugate / The Clock King)
Corpse Bride (Elder Gutknecht)
Spider-Man (elderly Adrian Toomes/Vulture)
 Star Wars: Ewoks (Logray)
Teenage Mutant Ninja Turtles (Baxter Stockman)

References

External links
 

1940 births
Living people
Male voice actors from Ehime Prefecture
Japanese male voice actors
Production Baobab voice actors